Charles Maclean Marais (born 29 August 1988) was a South African rugby union professional player for the  in the Pro14 and the  in the Currie Cup. His regular position is prop.

Career

Youth and Varsity rugby

Despite not representing  at secondary school level while a scholar at Paarl Boys' High School, Marais were included in the  squad for the 2007 Under-19 Provincial Championship after he moved to Bloemfontein to enroll at the University of the Free State. He also represented his university side in the Varsity Cup competition, playing for them in five consecutive seasons between 2009 and 2013, amassing 26 appearances and scoring three tries.

Free State Cheetahs

His first class debut came during the 2010 Vodacom Cup competition. He remained involved in the Free State's Vodacom Cup campaigns in 2011, 2012 and 2013, making a total of fifteen appearances. However, he was never included in a Currie Cup squad during his time in Bloemfontein.

Griffons

Golden Lions / Lions

He was a regular in their squad for the 2014 Vodacom Cup competition, playing in all ten of their matches during the competition, starting eight of those.

Marais also made his Super Rugby debut during the 2014 season, coming on as a substitute in their match against the  after being a late inclusion on the bench following Julian Redelinghuys' withdrawal through injury.

Eastern Province Kings

In July 2014, it was announced that Marais would join the  prior to the 2014 Currie Cup Premier Division competition. He signed a deal that would see him play for the Port Elizabeth-based side until the end of 2016.

References

South African rugby union players
Living people
1988 births
Sportspeople from Paarl
Rugby union props
Free State Cheetahs players
Golden Lions players
Griffons (rugby union) players
Lions (United Rugby Championship) players
Eastern Province Elephants players
Cheetahs (rugby union) players
Rugby union players from the Western Cape